The Hase is a  long river of Lower Saxony, Germany. It is a right tributary of the Ems, but part of its flow goes to the Else, that is part of the Weser basin.

Weser-Ems watershed 

 one third of its waters flow along the south side of the Wiehengebirge hills eastward from Gesmold into the Else, which begins there, and flows into the Werre at Kirchlengern (north of Herford). The Werre is a tributary of the Weser.
 two thirds of its waters (the Hase proper) flow northwest from Gesmold toward Osnabrück, past the towns listed below, and toward Meppen, where the Ems receives its flow.

Towns 

 Melle
 Bissendorf
 Osnabrück
 Wallenhorst
 Bramsche - to the south of this city the Hase crosses the Mittelland Canal
 Rieste
 Alfhausen - here the Hase forms the Alfsee, an artificial lake acting as flood retention basin for the lower reaches
 Bersenbrück
 Badbergen
 Quakenbrück - in the southeast the Hase divides into two branches: the Big Hase (passing the town in the northeast) and the Little Hase (which itself is divided into several branches within the town, one of which leaves the town northwards to the Big Hase) (Binnendelta)
 Menslage - here the Hase is channeled into the Little Hase
 Löningen - here it flows into a somewhat northerly branch: the Big Hase
 Herzlake - here the two branches flow together again
 Haselünne
 Meppen

Hydroelectricity 

Currently one Run-of-the-river hydroelectricity is installed

Pictures

See also
List of rivers of Lower Saxony

References

External links

 
Rivers of Lower Saxony
Federal waterways in Germany
Osnabrück (district)
Bissendorf
Rivers of Germany